Robert Joshua Dobbs (born January 26, 1995) is an American football quarterback who was an Unrestricted Free Agent as of March 16, 2023. He last played for the Tennessee Titans of the National Football League (NFL) in 2022. He played college football at Tennessee, and was drafted by the Pittsburgh Steelers in the fourth round of the 2017 NFL Draft.

Early years
Dobbs was born and raised in Alpharetta, Georgia, the son of Stephanie and Robert Dobbs. His mother retired from United Parcel Service (UPS) as a region manager in corporate human resources and his father is a senior vice president for Wells Fargo bank. Dobbs has alopecia areata, an autoimmune disease causing hair loss, which first developed when he was transitioning from elementary to junior high school.

Dobbs started playing football when he was five years old. He attended Wesleyan School and then Alpharetta High School. As a senior with the Alpharetta Raiders football team, he threw for 3,625 yards with 29 touchdowns. Dobbs was a three-star recruit by Rivals.com and a four-star by Scout.com. He originally committed to Arizona State University to play college football, but in February 2013, he changed his commitment to the University of Tennessee.

Dobbs majored in aerospace engineering during his time at the University of Tennessee. The university presented him with the 2017 Torchbearer Award, the highest honor for an undergraduate student, which recognizes accomplishments in the community and academics. Dobbs was heralded as possessing a perfect 4.0 grade point average and being named to the Southeastern Conference Academic Honor Roll.

College career

2013 season
As a true freshman at the University of Tennessee in 2013, Dobbs played in five games with four starts after starter Justin Worley was injured in a 45–10 loss against the #1 Alabama Crimson Tide at Bryant–Denny Stadium. Dobbs came into the game on the road at No. 1 Alabama and completed 5-of-12 passes for 75 yards. He started his first career game against the #10 Missouri Tigers at Faurot Field. He completed 26-of-42 passes for 240 yards in the 31–3 loss, which was the most passing yards in a freshman debut since 2004; Erik Ainge (118) and Brent Schaefer (123) against the UNLV Rebels. After a 55–23 loss to the #7 Auburn Tigers and a 14–10 loss to the Vanderbilt Commodores, Dobbs put together a solid performance against the Kentucky Wildcats at Commonwealth Stadium. In the 27–14 victory, Dobbs threw his first two career touchdown passes and had a 40-yard rushing touchdown. Overall, he completed 72-of-121 passes for 695 yards with two touchdowns and six interceptions and also rushed for 189 yards and a touchdown in his true freshman season.

2014 season
Dobbs competed with Worley (a senior) and Nathan Peterman (a sophomore), to be Tennessee's starter for the 2014 season. Worley was announced the starter, but Dobbs took over as the starter in November after Worley was injured in a 34–3 loss to the #3 Ole Miss Rebels at Vaught–Hemingway Stadium. Although Dobbs was not pushed into action immediately after the injury, in the following week against #4 Alabama Crimson Tide, Peterman was named the starter, but he was relieved quickly by Dobbs. Dobbs performed well in the 34–20 defeat by recording 192 passing yards and two rushing touchdowns against the Crimson Tide. Against South Carolina, Dobbs had a breakout performance against the Gamecocks at Williams–Brice Stadium. In the 45–42 comeback win in overtime, Dobbs had 301 passing yards, two passing touchdowns, 166 rushing yards, and three rushing touchdowns. Against the Kentucky Wildcats at Neyland Stadium, Dobbs had 297 passing yards, three passing touchdowns, 48 rushing yards, and one rushing touchdown in the 50–16 victory. Dobbs and team helped Tennessee reach their first bowl game since the 2010 season. Dobbs was named the 2015 TaxSlayer Bowl MVP in Tennessee's 45–28 victory over Iowa. In the game, Dobbs passed for 129 yards and one touchdown and rushed for 76 yards and two touchdowns. Dobbs threw for 1,206 yards with nine touchdowns and six interceptions during his sophomore season. He finished the 2014 season with 469 yards rushing and eight rushing touchdowns in just six games.
Dobbs received two Offensive Player of the Week honors from the Southeastern Conference, both of which came from his combined passing and rushing performances for over 400 yards in each game.

2015 season
Dobbs entered the 2015 season as Tennessee's starting quarterback. He started and appeared in all 12 regular season games and the bowl game. To open Tennessee's season on September 5, Dobbs recorded 205 passing yards, two passing touchdowns, 89 rushing yards, and one rushing touchdown against the Bowling Green Falcons in a 59–30 win at Nissan Stadium in Nashville, Tennessee. In a 2OT 31–24 loss to the #19 Oklahoma Sooners in the Tennessee 2015 home opener, Dobbs had 125 passing yards, one passing touchdown, 12 rushing yards, and one rushing touchdown. In a 28–27 loss to SEC East rival Florida at Ben Hill Griffin Stadium, Dobbs had a season-high 136 rushing yards and had a 58-yard receiving touchdown thrown by teammate wide receiver Jauan Jennings on a trick play. Dobbs's touchdown reception against Florida was the first reception by a Tennessee quarterback since Peyton Manning caught a 10-yard pass from running back Jamal Lewis in 1997 against Arkansas. Against the rival #19 Georgia Bulldogs, Dobbs had a season-high 312 yards passing and three touchdowns to go along with 118 rushing yards and two touchdowns. His efforts in the game led Tennessee to their first win over the Bulldogs since 2009. Against the #8 Alabama Crimson Tide in their annual rivalry game, Dobbs had 171 yards passing and one passing touchdown in the narrow 19–14 loss at Bryant–Denny Stadium. Against rival South Carolina, Dobbs passed for 255 yards and two touchdowns in the 27–24 home victory. Dobbs led Tennessee to a 9–4 record, which was the most wins for the Tennessee program since 2007. The 2015 season was culminated with a 45–6 victory over the #12 Northwestern Wildcats in the 2016 Outback Bowl. In the bowl game, Dobbs had two rushing touchdowns.

2016 season
Dobbs entered the 2016 season as Tennessee's starting quarterback in his final season of collegiate eligibility. He started and appeared in all 12 regular season games and the bowl game. Dobbs started the season with a solid performance in a home game against Appalachian State. In the 20–13 overtime win, Dobbs had 192 yards passing but fumbled on the goal line; the ball was recovered by teammate and running back Jalen Hurd to give Tennessee the go-ahead score. In the 2016 Pilot Flying J Battle at Bristol, Dobbs three passing touchdowns to go along with two rushing touchdowns. In a 38–28 comeback victory over the #19 Florida Gators, Dobbs had 319 yards passing, four passing touchdowns, 80 rushing yards, and a rushing touchdown to lead the Volunteers to their first win over the Gators since 2004. Against #25 Georgia, Dobbs had 230 yards passing, three passing touchdowns, and a rushing touchdown to win 34–31. Dobbs's last touchdown was a Hail Mary throw to wide receiver Jauan Jennings as time expired. The winning play is referenced by many as the "Dobbs-Nail Boot". With the victory, Tennessee was 5–0 with Dobbs as quarterback and ranked as high as top 10 in some polls. In a 2OT 45–38 loss to the #8 Texas A&M Aggies at Kyle Field, Dobbs had a season-high 398 passing yards and one passing touchdown. In addition, he caught a receiving touchdown from Jauan Jennings, his second career receiving touchdown. Dobbs continued solid performances over the rest of the season: he had five touchdowns, 223 passing yards and 190 rushing yards in a 63–37 win over Missouri and 340 passing yards in a 45–34 loss against Vanderbilt at Vanderbilt Stadium. Despite his play, Tennessee faded from their 5–0 start to finish 8–4.

In the final game of his Tennessee career, Dobbs led the Volunteers past the #24 Nebraska Cornhuskers by a score of 38–28 in the 2016 Music City Bowl at Nissan Stadium in Nashville. He had 291 passing yards, one passing touchdown, 11 rushes for 118 yards, and three rushing touchdowns. Dobbs was named the MVP of the game.

Dobbs led Tennessee to a second consecutive 9–4 record. Tennessee's 18 wins with Dobbs at the helm were the most for the school over a two-year span since 2006–2007.

Dobbs was inducted into Omicron Delta Kappa at Tennessee in 2016.

College football statistics

Professional career
Dobbs received an invitation to the Senior Bowl and was named the starting quarterback for the South. He finished the game completing 12-of-15 pass attempts for 102 passing yards and an interception, as the South defeated the North 16–15. The majority of NFL draft experts and analysts projected him to be a fourth to fifth round pick. NFL analyst Mike Mayock projected him to be selected in the second round and NFL.com projected him to be drafted in the third round. After attending the NFL Scouting Combine, he was ranked the seventh best quarterback in the draft by ESPN, the ninth best quarterback by Sports Illustrated, and NFLDraftScout.com ranked him the eighth best quarterback in the draft. He attended Tennessee's Pro Day and scripted his own set of plays; 19 other teammates also participated in Tennessee's Pro Day.  He held workouts for six teams: the Kansas City Chiefs, Tennessee Titans, Carolina Panthers, San Diego Chargers, Pittsburgh Steelers, and New Orleans Saints.

The Pittsburgh Steelers selected Dobbs in the fourth round (135th overall) of the 2017 NFL Draft. He was the seventh quarterback selected, and the Steelers also drafted his former Tennessee and Senior Bowl teammate, cornerback Cameron Sutton. He replaced Zach Mettenberger following the draft.

Pittsburgh Steelers (first tenure)

2017 season
On May 22, 2017, the Pittsburgh Steelers signed Dobbs to a four-year, $2.95 million contract with a signing bonus of $554,295.

Dobbs was named the starter for the Steelers' pre-season opener against the New York Giants.

After two starts and four appearances during the pre-season, Dobbs spent his entire rookie season behind incumbent starter Ben Roethlisberger and long-term backup Landry Jones.

2018 season
Dobbs made his NFL regular season debut on October 7, 2018, in a 41–17 Steelers win against the Atlanta Falcons, as on the final play of the game, he kneeled down for a loss of 3 yards.

On November 4, 2018, in a 23–16 Steelers Week 9 victory against the Baltimore Ravens, Dobbs completed a 22-yard pass to JuJu Smith-Schuster, after stepping in for Ben Roethlisberger, who got injured on the previous play. In Week 14, against the Oakland Raiders, Dobbs once again had to step in for Roethlisberger, who had suffered a rib injury. He finished 4-of-9 for 24 yards and one interception in the 24–21 loss. Overall, in the 2018 season, he appeared in five games and went 6-of-12 for 43 yards and one interception.

Jacksonville Jaguars
On September 9, 2019, Dobbs was traded to the Jacksonville Jaguars for a fifth-round pick in the 2020 NFL Draft. Dobbs was traded after Mason Rudolph won the backup job and Jaguars’ quarterback Nick Foles sustained a broken clavicle during the season opener and was subsequently placed on injured-reserve.

While in Jacksonville, Dobbs participated in an internship at NASA's Kennedy Space Center.

On September 5, 2020, Dobbs was waived by the Jaguars.

Pittsburgh Steelers (second stint) 
On September 6, 2020, Dobbs was claimed off of waivers by the Pittsburgh Steelers, his former team. He re-signed with the Steelers on a one-year contract on April 19, 2021.

On August 31, 2021, Dobbs was placed on injured reserve.

Cleveland Browns
On April 9, 2022, Dobbs signed a one-year, $1 million deal with the Cleveland Browns. He was waived on November 28, 2022, after Deshaun Watson returned from suspension.

Detroit Lions
On December 5, 2022, Dobbs was signed to the Detroit Lions practice squad.

Tennessee Titans
On December 21, 2022, Dobbs was signed by the Tennessee Titans off the Lions practice squad.

On December 29, with Ryan Tannehill out for the season with an injury and rookie Malik Willis underperforming, Dobbs was named the starter for the Titans Week 17 matchup against the Dallas Cowboys. In his first NFL start, Dobbs completed 20-of-39 passes for 232 yards, his first career touchdown pass, and an interception in the 27–13 loss.

On January 2, head coach Mike Vrabel announced that Dobbs would start the Week 18 matchup against the Jacksonville Jaguars. Needing a win to clinch the division, Dobbs completed 20-of-29 passes for 179 yards to go with a touchdown and an interception. Despite leading for most of the game, Dobbs was sacked from behind by Jaguars safety Rayshawn Jenkins and fumbled the ball, with the Jaguars returning it 37 yards for the go-ahead touchdown with under three minutes to go. The Titans lost 20–16, ultimately costing them a playoff spot.

NFL career statistics

References

External links

 
 
 Tennessee Titans bio
 Tennessee Volunteers bio

1995 births
Living people
Aerospace engineers
African-American players of American football
American football quarterbacks
Cleveland Browns players
Detroit Lions players
Jacksonville Jaguars players
People from Alpharetta, Georgia
People with autoimmune disease
Pittsburgh Steelers players
Players of American football from Georgia (U.S. state)
Sportspeople from Fulton County, Georgia
Tennessee Volunteers football players
Tennessee Titans players